Islavale Football Club are a Scottish football club based in the town of Keith, Moray. The club were based at Fife Park in the Fife Keith area of the town before moving to Simpson Park in 1998. The Vale are near neighbours of local Highland League side Keith, whose Kynoch Park ground they used to occasionally share. Team colours are red and black.

Notable former players
 Colin Hendry – Former Scotland captain. Joined Dundee from Islavale in 1983.

Honours
 North Region (North) League winners: 1970–71, 1996–97, 1997–98, 1998–99
 Morayshire Junior League winners: 1961–62
 North Region Division Two winners: 2003–04
 North (Rollstud) Regional Cup: 2002–03, 2004–05, 2005–06, 2015–16
 Morrison Trophy: 2007–08
 Gordon Williamson Trophy: 1965–66, 1989–90, 1990–91, 1992–93, 1998–99
 Morayshire Junior Cup: 1960–61, 1964–65, 1971–72, 1980–81, 1995–96, 1998–99, 2000–01
 Matthew Cup: 1961–62, 1965–66, 1986–87, 1991–92
 Nicholson Cup: 1970–71
 Robertson Cup: 1966–67, 1989–90, 1992–93, 1996–97, 1998–99, 1999–00
 Clive Williamson Trophy: 1998–99, 1999–00
 Stewart Memorial Cup: 1961–62, 1990–91, 1991–92, 1996–97, 2000–01
 Connon Cup: 1954–55, 1956–57, 1967–68, 1998–99
 North of Scotland (Morayshire) Cup: 1966–67, 1970–71, 1971–72, 1976–77, 1986–87
 White Horse Cup: 1965–66
 Elginshire Cup: 2016–17

References

External links
 Club website
 Scottish Football Historical Archive
 Non-League Scotland

Football in Moray
Football clubs in Scotland
Scottish Junior Football Association clubs
Association football clubs established in 1949
1949 establishments in Scotland
Keith, Moray